1924 in Argentine football saw Boca Juniors winning its 4th. league title after a great campaign where the team won 18 over 19 matches disputed, also finishing unbeaten.

On the other hand, dissident AAm tournament was won by San Lorenzo, which obtained its 2nd. consecutive title.

Primera División

Asociación Argentina de Football - Copa Campeonato
Club Atlético Sportsman made its debut in Primera División.

Asociación Amateur de Football
Liberal Argentino made its debut in Primera División.

Lower divisions

Primera B
AFA Champion: Chacarita Juniors
AAm Champion: Excursionistas

Primera C
AFA Champion: Leandro N. Alem
AAm Champion: Racing III

Domestic cups

Copa Ibarguren
Champion: Boca Juniors

Copa de Competencia (AAm)
Champion: Independiente

References

 
Seasons in Argentine football
1924 in association football
1924 in South American football